Charly Trussardi (Baie-Mahault, 21 March 1997) is an Guadalupean-born Italian rugby union player.
His usual position is as a Scrum-Half and he currently plays for Albi in Top14. 

From 2019 to 2021, Trussardi played with Italian Pro14 team Benetton.  In 2020-21 season, he played also for Rovigo Delta in Top10 as additional player from Benetton. 

After playing for Italy Under 20 in 2016 and 2017, in 2018 Trussardi was named in the Emerging Italy squad for the World Rugby Nations Cup.

References 

It's Rugby France Profile Player
Profile Player
Profile of Charly Trussardi on allrugby.com

Italian rugby union players

1997 births
Living people
Rugby union scrum-halves
ASM Clermont Auvergne players
AS Béziers Hérault players
Benetton Rugby players
Rugby Rovigo Delta players
SC Albi players